Cowboy Mouth is a short one act theatrical play originally produced in 1971 by Sam Shepard. Patti Smith is oftentimes credited as a co-writer.

Premiere Productions 
The play received its world premiere at The Traverse Theatre in Edinburgh, Scotland on April 12, 1971. The production was directed by Gordon Stewart.

The play received its American premiere at The American Place Theatre in New York, New York on April 29, 1971. The production was directed by Robert Glaudini. In this production Sam Shepard and his wife at the time Patti Slim played the two leads.

Plot
The cast consists of three characters. The character of Slim is an anthropomorphic cat dressed like a coyote while the character of Cavale is an anthropomorphic crow. Rounding out the cast is a symbolic character simply entitled Lobster Man.

The play follows Slim and Cavale, two aspiring rock stars living in sin together. As the first major turning point of action in the play, Cavale kidnaps Slim at gunpoint and holds him captive in her motel room for an unspecified amount of time; the two have fallen in love despite that he has a wife and child in Brooklyn. Unable to move, yet at complete unrest, Slim swings from blaming Cavale for the disaster that is his life to begging her to tell him stories about French poets. Cavale was formerly incarcerated and she explores various past experiences including electric shocks and having to wear metal plates around her club foot when she was younger. She also muses about playing the ugly duckling as a child, being forced into the role without even the satisfaction of emerging as a beautiful swan at the end. Near the end of the piece the two call on an imaginary Lobster Man for sustenance and entertainment.

Genre and Themes 
Sam Shepard had been working extensively in New York as a playwright by 1971, most notable at La Mama Theatre which offers an unbridled platform for playwright to display their work. This piece, along with many early Sam Shepard one-acts plays follows the theatrical genre of Theatre of the Absurd. 

Themes utilised within the short piece follow that the American Dream does little more for the individual besides spoiling happiness. The title of the play comes from the expressed idea that modern Americans were looking for a 'saint with a cowboy mouth'.

Writing
In her book Just Kids, co-writer Smith details the writing of Cowboy Mouth near the conclusion of her relationship with Shepard. At Shepard's urging, the two retired to his room to write the play over the course of a night. Smith was reluctant to begin writing and write in conflict, but Shepard encouraged her to "Say anything. You can't make a mistake when you improvise." Smith wrote:"Sam was right. It wasn't hard at all to write the play. We just told each other stories. The characters were ourselves, and we encoded our love, imagination, and indiscretions in Cowboy Mouth. Perhaps it wasn't so much a play as a ritual. We ritualized the end of our adventure and created a portal of escape for Sam."Slim was the name Shepard used to introduced himself to Smith when the two of them met. Like Slim, Shepard was married and had an infant at the time he and Smith were in a relationship and wrote the play. Like Slim, Shepard returned to his family, though he did so on the third night of Cowboy Mouth.

Cavale's name comes from the book La Cavale, Smith's favorite book of the French-Algerian writer Albertine Sarrazin. "Cavale" means "escape" in French.

References

External links 
 Cowboy Mouth
 Quote from the play
 Review at After Dark magazine

1971 plays
Plays by Sam Shepard
Plays by Patti Smith
Autobiographical plays
Plays set in the United States